West Island, part of the South Keeling Islands, is the capital of the Cocos (Keeling) Islands, an Australian external territory in the Indian Ocean. The population is roughly 120, making it the third smallest capital in the world, and consists mainly of Europeans. It is less populous than Home Island, the only other inhabited island.

West Island was part of the Clunies-Ross plantation and an airstrip was built here during World War II. As well as all the government buildings, it contains the airport, a general store and tourist accommodation. In November 2013 it was revealed that the Australian Signals Directorate operates a listening station on West Island.

Education 
Cocos Islands District High School operates a primary and secondary campus on West Island. Most of the students of that campus originate from the Australian continent.

Heritage listings 
West Island contains a number of heritage-listed sites, including:
 Morea Close: Administration Building Forecourt
 Air Force Road: Direction Island Houses
 Qantas Close: Government House
 Sydney Highway: Qantas Huts
 RAAF Memorial
 Air Force Road: Type 2 Residences
 William Keeling Crescent: Type T Houses Precinct
 Orion Close: West Island Elevated Houses
 Air Force Road: West Island Housing Precinct
 Alexander Street: West Island Mosque

Climate 
West Island experiences a tropical rainforest climate (Köppen: Af, Trewartha: Aral), with hot and humid conditions experiences year round. The islands experience two seasons that often overlap: the trade wind season from May/June to September/October, and the calmer doldrum season from November through to May. Precipitation is moderate to high year round, thanks to its position at the southern edge of the equatorial low pressure belt. North-west monsoons deliver rain during the doldrum, while the southeastern trade winds also give rain for much of the year. Cyclones have the potential to seriously effect the flora and fauna on the island. The 1989-90 South-West Indian Ocean cyclone season caused damage to the islands, with Tropical Cyclone Walter hitting the island around the 13th of March 1990. Extreme temperatures, however, are subdued by the influence of the Indian Ocean. Extremes only range from 32.8 °C (91.0 °F) on 23 February 2017 to 20.4 °C (68.7 °F) on 27 December 2018.

See also 
 Direction Island, Cocos (Keeling) Islands
 Home Island
 Horsburgh Island
 North Keeling

References 

 
Populated places in the Cocos (Keeling) Islands
Capitals in Asia